880 Herba is a minor planet orbiting the Sun that was discovered by German astronomer Max Wolf on 22 July 1917 in Heidelberg.

Photometric observations of this asteroid at the Organ Mesa Observatory in Las Cruces, New Mexico, in 2011 gave a light curve with a period of 12.266 ± 0.001 hours and a brightness variation of 0.13 ± 0.02 in magnitude. The curve is asymmetrical with one maxima and one minima.

880 Herba is named after Herba, the Greek god of misery and poverty.

References

External links 
 Lightcurve plot of 880 Herba, Palmer Divide Observatory, B. D. Warner (2006)
 Asteroid Lightcurve Database (LCDB), query form (info )
 Dictionary of Minor Planet Names, Google books
 Asteroids and comets rotation curves, CdR – Observatoire de Genève, Raoul Behrend
 Discovery Circumstances: Numbered Minor Planets (1)-(5000) – Minor Planet Center
 
 

000880
Discoveries by Max Wolf
Named minor planets
000880
19170722